Louisiana's 7th State Senate district is one of 39 districts in the Louisiana State Senate. It has been represented by Democrat Gary Carter Jr. since 2021.

Geography
District 7 covers much of southern New Orleans and parts of Jefferson and Plaquemines Parishes, including all of Algiers and parts of Gretna, Terrytown, and Belle Chasse.

The district overlaps with Louisiana's 1st and 2nd congressional districts, and with the 85th, 87th, 102nd, and 105th districts of the Louisiana House of Representatives.

Recent election results
Louisiana uses a jungle primary system. If no candidate receives 50% in the first round of voting, when all candidates appear on the same ballot regardless of party, the top-two finishers advance to a runoff election.

2021 special

2019

2015

2011

Federal and statewide results in District 7

References

Louisiana State Senate districts
Orleans Parish, Louisiana
Jefferson Parish, Louisiana
Plaquemines Parish, Louisiana